Chikilinta is a village in Rajavommangi Mandal, Alluri Sitharama Raju district in the state of Andhra Pradesh in India.

Geography 

Demographics 
 India census, Chikilinta had a population of 877, out of which 454 were male and 423 were female. The population of children below 6 years of age was 13%. The literacy rate of the village was 44%.

References 

Villages in Rajavommangi mandal